Flood Tide is a 1934 British drama film directed by John Baxter and starring George Carney, Janice Adair and Minnie Rayner. It was made at Twickenham Studios as a quota quickie for release by RKO Pictures.

The sets were designed by James A. Carter, the regular Twickenham art director. Many scenes of the film were shot on location along the River Thames.

Synopsis
A retiring lockkeeper and his wife are concerned that their son Ted Salter, who is serving in the Royal Navy should settle down and start a family. They hope that this will be with his childhood sweetheart Betty the daughter of their old friend Captain Bill Buckett who operates a boat on the River Thames. However Ted has taken up with a flirtatious barmaid, at one point even risking arrest as a deserter because of her before reconciling with Betty. The film ends with Bill Buckett  triumphing in an annual regatta.

Cast
 George Carney as Captain Bill Buckett  
 Janice Adair as Betty Buckett  
 Minnie Rayner as Sarah Salter  
 Wilson Coleman as Ben Salter  
 Leslie Hatton as Ted Salter  
 Peggy Novak as Mabel Pringle  
 Mark Daly as Scotty  
 Edgar Driver as Titch  
 Wilfred Benson as Addock  
 William Fazan as Sir Thomas Maitland  
 Bertram Dench as Charles Tupper

References

Bibliography
 Low, Rachael. Filmmaking in 1930s Britain. George Allen & Unwin, 1985.
 Wood, Linda. British Films, 1927-1939. British Film Institute, 1986.

External links

1934 films
British drama films
1934 drama films
1930s English-language films
Films shot at Twickenham Film Studios
Films directed by John Baxter
Films set in England
Films set in London
Seafaring films
British black-and-white films
1930s British films